The 18th Guam Legislature was a meeting of the Guam Legislature. It convened in Hagatna, Guam on January 7, 1985 and ended on January 5, 1987, during the 3rd and 4th years of Ricardo J. Bordallo's 2nd Gubernatorial Term.

In the 1984 Guamanian general election, the Democratic Party of Guam won an eleven-to-ten (11-10) majority of seats in the Guam Legislature.

Party Summary

Membership

References 

Politics of Guam
Political organizations based in Guam
Legislature of Guam